South is one of the six multi-member constituencies of the Althing, the national legislature of Iceland. The constituency was established as Southern in 1959 following the nationwide extension of proportional representation for elections to the Althing.  It was renamed South in 2003 when parts of Eastern and Reykjanes constituencies were merged into the Southern constituency following the re-organisation of constituencies across Iceland. South consists of the Southern and Southern Peninsula regions. The constituency currently elects nine of the 63 members of the Althing using the open party-list proportional representation electoral system. At the 2021 parliamentary election it had 38,424 registered electors.

Electoral system
South currently elects nine of the 63 members of the Althing using the open party-list proportional representation electoral system. Constituency seats are allocated using the D'Hondt method. Compensatory seats (equalisation seas) are calculated based on the national vote and are allocated using the D'Hondt method at the constituency level. Only parties that reach the 5% national threshold compete for compensatory seats.

Election results

Summary

(Excludes compensatory seats.)

Detailed

2020s

2021
Results of the 2021 parliamentary election held on 25 September 2021:

The following candidates were elected:
Ásmundur Friðriksson (D), 4,770.50 votes; Ásthildur Lóa Þórsdóttir (F), 3,835.67 votes; Birgir Þórarinsson (M), 2,199.67 votes; Guðbrandur Einarsson (C), 1,835.67 votes; Guðrún Hafsteinsdóttir (D), 7,275.33 votes; Hafdís Hrönn Hafsteinsdóttir (B), 4,742.67 votes; Jóhann Friðrik Friðriksson (B), 5,917.17 votes; Oddný G. Harðardóttir (S), 2,259.33 votes; Sigurður Ingi Jóhannsson (B), 7,096.33 votes; and Vilhjálmur Árnason (D), 6,057.17 votes.

2010s

2017
Results of the 2017 parliamentary election held on 28 October 2017:

The following candidates were elected:
Ari Trausti Guðmundsson (V), 3,308.00 votes; Ásmundur Friðriksson (D), 5,588.00 votes; Birgir Þórarinsson (M), 3,991.33 votes; Karl Gauti Hjaltason (F), 2,497.67 votes; Oddný G. Harðardóttir (S), 2,650.67 votes; Páll Magnússon (D), 6,917.83 votes; Sigurður Ingi Jóhannsson (B), 5,227.50 votes; Silja Dögg Gunnarsdóttir (B), 3,914.50 votes; Smári McCarthy (P), 1,959.00 votes; and Vilhjálmur Árnason (D), 4,723.17 votes.

2016
Results of the 2016 parliamentary election held on 29 October 2016:

The following candidates were elected:
Ari Trausti Guðmundsson (V), 2,742.00 votes; Ásmundur Friðriksson (D), 7,306.25 votes; Jóna Sólveig Elínardóttir (C), 1,978.33 votes; Oddný G. Harðardóttir (S), 1,721.00 votes; Páll Magnússon (D), 8,444.88 votes; Sigurður Ingi Jóhannsson (B), 5,104.75 votes; Silja Dögg Gunnarsdóttir (B), 3,859.25 votes; Smári McCarthy (P), 3,428.33 votes; Unnur Brá Konráðsdóttir (D), 5,318.25 votes; and Vilhjálmur Árnason (D), 6,390.88 votes.

2013
Results of the 2013 parliamentary election held on 27 April 2013:

The following candidates were elected:
Ásmundur Friðriksson (D), 5,421.0 votes; Haraldur Einarsson (B), 5,783.6 votes; Oddný G. Harðardóttir (S), 2,714.3 votes; Páll Jóhann Pálsson (B), 6,945.6 votes; Páll Valur Björnsson (A), 1,199.0 votes; Ragnheiður Elín Árnadóttir (D), 7,519.9 votes; Sigurður Ingi Jóhannsson (B), 9,256.3 votes; Silja Dögg Gunnarsdóttir (B), 8,099.8 votes; Unnur Brá Konráðsdóttir (D), 6,605.9 votes; and Vilhjálmur Árnason (D), 4,791.9 votes.

2000s

2009
Results of the 2009 parliamentary election held on 25 April 2009:

The following candidates were elected:
Árni Johnsen (D), 4,781.2 votes; Atli Gíslason (V), 4,579.7 votes; Björgvin G. Sigurðsson (S), 6,925.3 votes; Eygló Harðardóttir (B), 3,993.7 votes; Margrét Tryggvadóttir (O), 1,374.0 votes; Oddný G. Harðardóttir (S), 6,344.0 votes; Ragnheiður Elín Árnadóttir (D), 6,903.7 votes; Róbert Marshall (S), 5,094.3 votes; Sigurður Ingi Jóhannsson (B), 5,363.0 votes; and Unnur Brá Konráðsdóttir (D), 4,897.8 votes.

2007
Results of the 2007 parliamentary election held on 12 May 2007:

The following candidates were elected:
Árni Johnsen (D), 6,284.1 votes; Árni Mathiesen (D), 8.904.2 votes; Atli Gíslason (V), 2,493.3 votes; Bjarni Harðarson (B), 3,554.2 votes; Björgvin G. Sigurðsson (S), 6,737.5 votes; Björk Guðjónsdóttir (D), 5,965.2 votes; Grétar Mar Jónsson (F), 1,755.7 votes; Guðni Ágústsson (B), 4,700.0 votes; Kjartan Ólafsson (D), 7,054.2 votes; and Lúðvík Bergvinsson (S), 4,958.0 votes.

2003
Results of the 2003 parliamentary election held on 10 May 2003:

The following candidates were elected:
Árni Ragnar Árnason (D), 7,214.5 votes; Björgvin G. Sigurðsson (S), 5,569.5 votes; Drífa Hjartardóttir (D), 5,911.8 votes; Guðjón Hjörleifsson (D), 4,807.8 votes; Guðni Ágústsson (B), 5,905.2 votes; Hjálmar Árnason (B), 4,441.7 votes; Jón Gunnarsson (S), 4,652.5 votes; Lúðvík Bergvinsson (S), 6,433.0 votes; Magnús Þór Hafsteinsson (F), 2,188.0 votes; and Margrét Frímannsdóttir (S), 7,404.6 votes.

1990s

1999
Results of the 1999 parliamentary election held on 8 May 1999:

The following candidates were elected:
Árni Johnsen (D), 4,269 votes; Drífa Hjartardóttir (D), 4,392 votes; Guðni Ágústsson (B), 3,652 votes; Ísólfur Gylfi Pálmason (B), 3,639 votes; Lúðvík Bergvinsson (S), 3,605 votes; and Margrét Frímannsdóttir (S), 3,593 votes.

1995
Results of the 1995 parliamentary election held on 8 April 1995:

The following candidates were elected:
Árni Johnsen (D), 4,218 votes; Guðni Ágústsson (B), 3,724 votes; Ísólfur Gylfi Pálmason (B), 3,761 votes; Lúðvík Bergvinsson (A), 874 votes; Margrét Frímannsdóttir (G), 2,038 votes; and Þorsteinn Pálsson (D), 4,254 votes.

1991
Results of the 1991 parliamentary election held on 20 April 1991:

The following candidates were elected:
Árni Johnsen (D), 4,491 votes; Eggert Haukdal (D), 4,492 votes; Guðni Ágústsson (B), 3,449 votes; Jón Helgason (B), 3,399 votes; Margrét Frímannsdóttir (G), 2,318 votes; and Þorsteinn Pálsson (D), 4,533 votes.

1980s

1987
Results of the 1987 parliamentary election held on 25 April 1987:

The following candidates were elected:
Eggert Haukdal (D), 3,486 votes; Guðni Ágústsson (B), 3,323 votes; Jón Helgason (B), 3,217 votes; Margrét Frímannsdóttir (G), 1,423 votes; Óli Þ. Guðbjartsson (S), 1,345 votes; and Þorsteinn Pálsson (D), 3,900 votes.

1983
Results of the 1983 parliamentary election held on 23 April 1983:

The following candidates were elected:
Árni Johnsen (D), 3,809 votes; Eggert Haukdal (D), 3,486 votes; Garðar Sigurðsson (G), 1,493 votes; Jón Helgason (B), 2,699 votes; Þórarinn Sigurjónsson (B), 2,938 votes; and Þorsteinn Pálsson (D), 4,187 votes.

1970s

1979
Results of the 1979 parliamentary election held on 2 and 3 December 1979:

The following candidates were elected:
Eggert Haukdal (L), 1,484 votes; Garðar Sigurðsson (G), 1,531 votes; Guðmundur Karlsson (D), 2,225 votes; Jón Helgason (B), 3,077 votes; Magnús Helgi Magnússon (A), 1,535 votes; Steinþór Gestsson (D), 2,425 votes; and Þórarinn Sigurjónsson (B), 3,355 votes.

1978
Results of the 1978 parliamentary election held on 25 June 1978:

The following candidates were elected:
Eggert Haukdal (D), 3,211 votes; Garðar Sigurðsson (G), 1,941 votes; Guðmundur Karlsson (D), 2,965 votes; Jón Helgason (B), 2,245 votes; Magnús Helgi Magnússon (A), 1,741 votes; and Þórarinn Sigurjónsson (B), 2,446 votes.

1974
Results of the 1974 parliamentary election held on 30 June 1974:

The following candidates were elected:
Garðar Sigurðsson (G), 1,366 votes; Guðlaugur Gíslason (D), 3,713 votes; Ingólfur Jónsson (D), 4,056 votes; Jón Helgason (B), 2,945 votes; Steinþór Gestsson (D), 3,378 votes; and Þórarinn Sigurjónsson (B), 3,210 votes.

1971
Results of the 1971 parliamentary election held on 13 June 1971:

The following candidates were elected:
Ágúst Þorvaldsson (B), 3,047 votes; Björn Fr. Björnsson (B), 2,788 votes; Garðar Sigurðsson (G), 1,391 votes; Guðlaugur Gíslason (D), 3,293 votes; Ingólfur Jónsson (D), 3,599 votes; and Steinþór Gestsson (D), 2,994 votes.

1960s

1967
Results of the 1967 parliamentary election held on 11 June 1967:

The following candidates were elected:
Ágúst Þorvaldsson (B), 3,056 votes; Björn Fr. Björnsson (B), 2,801 votes; Guðlaugur Gíslason (D), 3,273 votes; Ingólfur Jónsson (D), 3,576 votes; Karl Guðjónsson (G), 1,122 votes; and Steinþór Gestsson (D), 2,981 votes.

1963
Results of the 1963 parliamentary election held on 9 June 1963:

The following candidates were elected:
Ágúst Þorvaldsson (B), 2,996 votes; Björn Fr. Björnsson (B), 2,748 votes; Guðlaugur Gíslason (D), 3,110 votes; Helgi Bergs (B), 2,496 votes; Ingólfur Jónsson (D), 3,401 votes; and Sigurður Ó. Ólafsson (D), 2,831 votes.

1950s

October 1959
Results of the October 1959 parliamentary election held on 25 and 26 October 1959:

The following candidates were elected:
Ágúst Þorvaldsson (B), 2,796 votes; Björn Fr. Björnsson (B), 2,563 votes; Guðlaugur Gíslason (D), 2,962 votes; Ingólfur Jónsson (D), 3,232 votes; Karl Guðjónsson (G), 1,053 votes; and Sigurður Ó. Ólafsson (D), 2,693 votes.

References

1959 establishments in Iceland
Althing constituencies
Constituencies established in 1959
Althing constituency
Althing constituency